The Aroser Weisshorn is a mountain of the Plessur Alps, overlooking Arosa in the canton of Graubünden.

A two-stage cable car links the top of the mountain with the town and resort of Arosa — the base station is near to Arosa railway station.

See also
List of mountains of Switzerland accessible by public transport

References

External links

 Aroser Weisshorn on Hikr

Mountains of the Alps
Mountains of Switzerland
Mountains of Graubünden
Two-thousanders of Switzerland
Arosa
Tschiertschen-Praden